Norðhymbra preosta lagu ('the Northumbrian priests' law') is an Old English legal text found in the manuscript Cambridge, Corpus Christi College, MS 201, pp. 43–46 (which otherwise includes homilies and laws by Archbishop Wulfstan of York). In the summary of the Early English Laws project, "the law deals with offences committed against priests or churches, punishments for heathen practices, non-observance of Sundays, festivals and fasts, or for withholding church dues. The text post-dates 1023 and draws on legislation from the reigns" of Æthelred the Unready and Cnut the Great.

Editions
 Liebermann, F. (ed.), Die Gesetze der Angelsachsen, 3 vols (Halle a. S.: Niemeyer, 1903–16), I 380–85

References

Anglo-Saxon law